Gia Lam Airport  is an airport in Hanoi, Vietnam, located in Long Biên District, on the eastern bank of the Red River. It is primarily a military field, used by the Vietnam People's Air Force (VPAF), with MiG-21 fighters and Kamov Ka-28 helicopters stored in revetments. The airfield was inaugurated in 1936, before the Japanese occupation of French Indochina. The airport is currently used for military training activities, as well as for chartered helicopter taxi flights for tourists visiting nearby attractions such as Ha Long Bay. There are plans to convert Gia Lam to a civilian airport, serving short flights to and from locations in Northern Vietnam.

History

1936–40
Hébrard was hired by the city of Hanoi's Urban Planning and Architecture Services department in 1923 to supervise a number of urban renewal projects, including a new industrial area in Gia Lâm District, on the eastern bank of the Red River. Hébrard's plan for Gia Lam included a renovated railway station, along with space for factories, industrial establishments, and the new airfield. Upon its completion, it was one of two major airfields in the Hanoi area, the other being the (now-disused) Bach Mai Airfield. The airfield itself was constructed according to a design by French architect Félix Godard.

1940–46
On September 26, 1940, as part of the Invasion of French Indochina, Japanese forces took possession of the airfield, maintaining control throughout World War II, until their surrender to the Việt Minh during the August Revolution. Soon afterwards, the Democratic Republic of Vietnam was proclaimed, with Việt Minh leader Hồ Chí Minh as head of government. France initially accepted the new government, but this position changed when negotiations about the future of Vietnam as a state within the French Union collapsed. Guerrilla fighting began between Việt Minh fighters and the French, and on December 19, 1946, in response to attacks on French installations in and around Hanoi, French troops re-occupied the airfield.

First Indochina War
Gia Lam and Bach Mai later became the two major logistics bases supporting French operations at the Battle of Dien Bien Phu. Much of the equipment sent to the remote French military base at Dien Bien Phu passed through Gia Lam airfield, including the ten French M24 Chaffee tanks assigned to the isolated stronghold in northwestern Vietnam, which were each dismantled into 180 individual parts and flown to Dien Bien Phu on heavy cargo aircraft. After their defeat at Dien Bien Phu and the following 1954 Geneva Peace Accords, French forces, obliged to leave Vietnam, handed over the airfield to the Viet Minh. Gia Lam airfield was thereafter taken over by Ho Chi Minh's North Vietnamese government and used by the VPAF as their main airbase in the Hanoi area.

Vietnam War

During the Vietnam War, the American Joint Chiefs of Staff placed Gia Lam on a list of 94 recommended bombing targets in North Vietnam, identifying it as a major airbase and as a storage location for petroleum, oil and lubricants (POL). All North Vietnamese airfields were removed from the USAF's "restricted target" list in April 1967, and Gia Lam was one of six deemed suitable for fast jet operations. As a result, it sustained heavy damage as part of Operation Rolling Thunder, suffering repeated bomber attacks.

Following the cease-fire mandated by the Paris Peace Accords in January 1973, Gia Lam was the site of Operation Homecoming, the return of American POWs held by the North Vietnamese. The first repatriation, effected by the United States Air Force's Military Airlift Command, happened on February 12, 1973, when C-141s of the 63d Military Airlift Wing, flying from Clark Air Base in the Philippines, flew to Gia Lam and returned with a total of 116 former POWs. The first C-141 to return came to be known as the Hanoi Taxi, named after the writing on the flight engineer's panel by the POWs aboard the plane for the freedom flight. Arizona Senator John McCain was one of the POWs who flew home from Gia Lam on the Hanoi Taxi. From February 12 to April 4, there were 54 C-141 missions flying out of Hanoi, bringing the former POWs home.

Facilities
At one time, the headquarters of national flag carrier Vietnam Airlines were located at Gia Lam Airport.

Former airlines and destinations (until 1978)

Incidents and accidents 
On April 8, 2008, a Soviet-built Antonov An-26 turboprop aircraft on a training mission crashed into a field in Thanh Trì District, in the outskirts of Hanoi, killing five Vietnamese military pilots. The plane took off from Gia Lam Airport, and crashed on its way back. The cause of the accident was unknown. A Vietnamese military official who declined to be named said the plane belonged to Vietnam's 918 Air Transport Regiment.

Upcoming renovations 

Because of its proximity to the center of Hanoi compared to Noi Bai International Airport, part of Gia Lam Airport is expected to become a civilian airport in the near future, reserved for regional domestic airlines. This would allow passengers flying on short-haul flights, such as from Hanoi to Điện Biên, Vinh, or Nà Sản Airport in the northern province of Sơn La, to depart from Gia Lam airport, only 10 minutes away from the centre of Hanoi, rather than Noi Bai airport, which is located about an hour's drive away from the city. The airport would retain military uses.

Gia Lam's 2000 m by 45 m runway is suitable for small, short-haul aircraft such as ATR 72 twin-turboprops or Fokker 70 jets, which are already operated by Vietnam Airlines as part of their fleet. Under the approved development plan, the parking yard will be upgraded to receive three ATR 72 or Fokker 70 aircraft by 2015, increasing to five by 2025. Its annual capacity is projected to be 162,000 passengers in 2015, increasing further to 300,000 passengers by 2025. The airport will be about the same size as Na San and Dien Bien airports, and will not be able to receive larger Airbus or Boeing aircraft, which will continue to be received at Noi Bai.

The renovations, which would allow the airport to meet the standards of the International Civil Aviation Organization, are estimated to cost VND 287 billion (US$17.3
million). The renovated airport would be managed by the Northern Airport
Administration.

References 

Buildings and structures in Hanoi
Airports in Vietnam
Installations of the Vietnam People's Air Force
Transport in Hanoi